Ali Hazer (born 17 August 1984) is a Lebanese athlete competing in various events including the decathlon, 110 and 400 metres hurdles. He represented his country in the 60 metres hurdles at the 2012 World Indoor Championships without advancing from the first round.

His younger brother, Ahmad Hazer, is also an athlete.

International competitions

Personal bests

Outdoor
100 metres – 10.97 (+1.2 m/s, Beirut 2009)
200 metres – 22.11 (+0.6 m/s, Kolin 2016)
400 metres – 49.02 (Liberec 2014)
1500 metres – 4:42.33 (Beirut 2009)
110 metres hurdles – 14.69 (+0.8 m/s, Beirut 2009)
400 metres hurdles – 53.37 (Beirut 2016) NR
High jump – 1.87 (Beirut 2009)
Pole vault – 3.50 (Beirut 2009)
Long jump – 6.63 (+0.1 m/s, Doha 2011)
Shot put – 11.91 (Doha 2011)
Discus throw – 35.99 (Guangzhou 2009)
Javelin throw – 45.62 (Doha 2011)
Decathlon – 6716 (Beirut 2009)

Indoor
60 metres – 7.16 (Tehran 2010)
200 metres – 22.50 (Prague 2014) NR
400 metres – 50.72 (Doha 2008)
1000 metres – 2:52.32 (Tehran 2010) NR
60 metres hurdles – 8.51 (Prague 2014)
High jump – 1.83 (Tehran 2010)
Pole vault – 3.40 (Tehran 2010) NR
Long jump – 6.43 (	Tehran 2010)
Shot put – 11.59 (Tehran 2010) NR
Heptathlon – 4813 (Tehran 2010) NR

References
 

1984 births
Living people
Sportspeople from Beirut
Lebanese decathletes
Lebanese male hurdlers
Athletes (track and field) at the 2006 Asian Games
Athletes (track and field) at the 2014 Asian Games
Asian Games competitors for Lebanon
Competitors at the 2007 Summer Universiade
Competitors at the 2009 Summer Universiade
21st-century Lebanese people